Donatella Palermo is an Italian producer. She received Academy Award for Best Documentary Feature nominations for Fire at Sea with director Gianfranco Rosi at 89th Academy Awards.

Filmography
 2020 - Notturno (documentary) (producer)
 2020 - Last Words (producer)
 2016 - Fire at Sea (Fuocoammare) (Documentary) (producer) 
 2015 - Wondrous Boccaccio (producer) 
 2012 - L'Isola dell'angelo caduto (executive producer) 
 2012 - Tell No One (line producer) 
 2012 - Caesar Must Die (executive producer) / (co-producer) 
 2009 - Poeti (Documentary) (producer) 
 2009 - The Red Shadows (producer) 
 2007 - Una notte (associate producer) 
 2007 - Night Bus (executive producer) 
 2006 - The Ball (producer) 
 2006 - Lettere dal Sahara (producer) 
 2006 - Gemelline (Short) (producer) 
 2003 - Cinghiali of Portici (producer) 
 2003 - Letters in the Wind (producer) 
 2003 - Cuore scatenato (producer) 
 2002 - L'inverno (associate producer) 
 2000 - South Side Story (producer) 
 1999 - Appassionate (producer) 
 1998 - Viol@ (producer) 
 1997 - Tano da morire (producer) 
 1993 - Niente stasera (producer) 
 1991 - Il senso della vertigine (producer) 
 1991 - Footsteps on the Moon (producer) 
 1989 - Orlando sei (executive producer)

Awards
 2017: Academy Awards
 Academy Award for Best Documentary Feature - Fire at Sea 
 2016: International Documentary Association
 Best Documentary Feature - Fuocoammare
 1998: Italian National Syndicate of Film Journalists
 Best Producer (Migliore Produttore) - Tano da morire

References

External links
 

Living people
Italian film producers
Italian documentary filmmakers
Year of birth missing (living people)